Betiyaan (Urdu: بیٹیاں) is a Pakistani television family drama aired on ARY Digital from 8 October 2022 to 17 December 2022. It is produced by Fahad Mustafa and Ali Kazmi under Big Bang Entertainment. It stars Fatima Effendi, Fahad Shaikh and Osama Tahir in lead roles.

The serial emerged as one of the highest rated serials of Pakistani television for the year 2022.

Cast 
 Fatima Effendi as Fiza (main lead actress)
 Fahad Shaikh as Danish ( main lead actor)
 Mahenur Haider as Ayeza ( Younger sister of Fiza)
 Osama Tahir as Saad (Ayeza's Husband) 
 Tania Hussain as Anum (Fiza & Ayeza's sister)
 Syed Mohammad Ahmed as Laiq (Father of Ayeza, Fiza, Haniya and Anum)
 Qudisa Ali as Haniya (another Sister of Fiza)
 Emaan Khan as youngest sister of Fiza
 Beena Masroor as Laiq's Mother
 Javeria Saud as Laiq's Sister
 Tabbasum Arif as Nighat, Saad's mother
 Shehryar Zaidi as Danish's Father
 Sabahat Ali Bukhari as Jahanara (Danish's mother)
 Sajjad Pal as Danish's Brother
 Saeed Faridi uncle of Fiza
 Ali Kureshi

References

Pakistani television series
2022 Pakistani television series debuts
2022 Pakistani television series endings
ARY Digital
ARY Digital Network people